Ra Gun-ah (Korean: 라건아; born Ricardo Preston Ratliffe; February 20, 1989) is an American-born South Korean basketball player for Jeonju KCC Egis of the Korean Basketball League (KBL) and the South Korea national basketball team. Ra played collegiately at the University of Missouri.

Early life and college career
Ra Gun-ah was born Ricardo Preston Ratliffe in Hampton, Virginia, played at Kecoughtan High School and the College of Central Florida.  While there, he twice earned first team National Junior College Athletic Association All-American honors.  He averaged 27.4 points and 11.3 rebounds per game as a sophomore.

To complete his college career, Ratliffe chose Missouri over Alabama, Clemson and Arkansas.  He averaged 10.6 points and 6.0 rebounds per game in his junior season and was named Big 12 Conference Newcomer of the Year.

In his senior season, Ratliffe helped lead the Tigers to a 30–5 record and a Big 12 tournament championship.  Ratliffe averaged 13.9 points, 7.5 rebounds and 1.0 blocks per game as the team's primary post presence.  At the close of the season, Ratliffe was named second team All-Big 12.  On the season, Ratliffe attained a 69.3% field goal percentage, which led the nation for the 2011–12 season and was a Missouri and Big 12 Conference record.  Ratliffe spent much of the season chasing the all-time single-season NCAA record of 74.6%, held by Steve Johnson of Oregon State, leading the mark as late as February 2012.

Following the close of the regular season, Ratliffe competed in the 2012 Reese's College All-Star Game at the 2012 Final Four.  He scored 21 points and collected 10 rebounds to earn the West team's "Perfect Player" award.

Professional career
Following the close of his college career, Ratliffe was not selected in the 2012 NBA draft.  However, he was the first American college player selected in the Korean Basketball League.  He was selected sixth overall by Ulsan Mobis Phoebus and began his professional career with them in the 2012–13 season.

In 2014, Ratliffe won the William Jones Cup MVP and joined teammates Chang Yong Song and Tae Young Moon on the tournament Best Five. At the William Jones Cup, He averaged 24.3 points, 15.7 rebounds, and 1.7 blocks per game.

On March 5, 2016, Ratliffe was signed by Star Hotshots of the Philippine Basketball Association (PBA) to replace Denzel Bowles who had to leave for the United States after the death of a relative.

On May 9, 2017, Ratliffe was again called by the Star Hotshots as their import for the 2017 Commissioners Cup. On Game 2 of the 2017 semifinal round against the San Miguel Beermen, Ratliffe recorded 25 points and a career-high 35 rebounds in a 76–77 loss to the Beermen. 

Ra Gun-ah signed with Jeonju KCC Egis in 2020. He averaged 17 points, 10.3 rebounds, one steal and 1.3 blocks per game. Ratliffe re-signed with the team on September 26.

National team career
In January 2018, Ratliffe became a naturalized South Korean. Ratliffe played for the South Korean national team against the North Korean national team in Pyongyang Arena, Pyongyang, during a July 2018 friendly match. He was given the Korean name Ra Gun-ah after he was naturalized.

At the 2019 FIBA World Cup, although playing in only five games, Ra Gun-ah led the tournament with 23.0 points and 12.8 rebounds per game. The South Korean national team finished the tournament in 26th place of 32 teams, after being eliminated in preliminary group.

References

External links
 Missouri Tigers bio
 asia-basket.commprofile
 Ra Gun-ah FIBA profile
 

1989 births
Living people
2019 FIBA Basketball World Cup players
American emigrants to South Korea
American expatriate basketball people in the Philippines
American expatriate basketball people in South Korea
American men's basketball players
Basketball players at the 2018 Asian Games
Asian Games bronze medalists for South Korea
Medalists at the 2018 Asian Games
Asian Games medalists in basketball
Basketball players from Virginia
Junior college men's basketball players in the United States
Magnolia Hotshots players
Missouri Tigers men's basketball players
Naturalized citizens of South Korea
Philippine Basketball Association imports
Power forwards (basketball)
Seoul Samsung Thunders players
South Korean men's basketball players
South Korean people of African-American descent
Sportspeople from Hampton, Virginia
Ulsan Hyundai Mobis Phoebus players